Messana O'Rorke is an American architecture and interior design firm that was founded in 1996 in New York City. It has won a number of design awards for projects in the United States and internationally. The principals of the firm are Brian Messana, AIA and Toby O'Rorke, RIBA.

Design Philosophy 
"The firm believes in the inherent ability of design to enhance the quality of life, and so aim to operate at the point where architecture, contemporary culture and current technology meet. The firm takes this approach to a range of residential, commercial and institutional projects in the United States and abroad, applying their skills to every aspect of the process from furniture and functional products to interior architecture and the built environment."

Projects 
 Ten Broeck Cottage
 Malin + Goetz
 Charles Street Town House
 Hans Dorsinville Apartment
 Ramza Residence, Manhattan, New York
 Phoenix House
 Vieques House
 Box House
 9th Street Loft
 Skin Care Lab
 Casper Apartment
 DKNY Geneva
 Weinstein Loft
 Storefront Loft
 200 E 62

Awards

Exhibitions 
 2013 “The Phoenix House” Project 2013 Global Architecture Houses Exhibition, GA Gallery, Tokyo, Japan. 
 2009 “The Cube House” Project 2009 Global Architecture Houses Exhibition, GA Gallery, 	Tokyo, Japan.
 2008 “The Wall House” Project 2008 Global Architecture Houses Exhibition, GA Galley, Tokyo, 	Japan.
 2007 “The Box House” Project 2007 Global Architecture Houses Exhibition, GA Galley, Tokyo, 	Japan.
 2006 StoreFront, New York City AIA Design Awards Exhibition, New York City AIA Center for Architecture, New York, USA
 2006 Zaragoza 2008 Exposition, Water and the Sustainable Development of Cities, Proposal Exhibition, Zaragoza, Spain
 2005 “Galahad House” Project 2005 Global Architecture Houses Exhibition, GA Gallery, Tokyo 	Japan 
 2004 Flight 93 National Memorial Competition Entrants Exhibition. Summerset, Pennsylvania, USA
 2004 “Ten Broeck Cottage” Project 2004 Global Architecture Houses Exhibition, GA Gallery, Tokyo, Japan
 2003 The World Trade Center International Memorial Competition Entrants Exhibition New York, New York.
 2003 The High Line International Competition Entrants Exhibition @ Grad Central New York, New York
 2003 Pearth Amboy High School Competition Entrants Exhibition, Pearth Amboy, New Jersey, USA
 2003 “Island House” Project 2003 Global Architecture Houses Exhibition, GA Gallery, Tokyo, Japan 
 2002 Axis Theatre, Design Awards Exhibition, Arts Center New York, USA
 2002 “Savage House” Project 2002 Global Architecture Houses Exhibition, GA Gallery, Tokyo, Japan 
 2001 Skin Care Lab, Design Awards Exhibition, Arts Center, New York USA
 2001 “Apple Orchard House.” Project 2001. Global Architecture Houses Exhibition, GA Gallery, Tokyo, Japan
 2000 “Fisherman’s House”, Project 2000. Global Architecture Houses Exhibition, GA Gallery, Tokyo, Japan
 1999 Axis Theatre, Design Awards Exhibition, Arts Center New York, USA
 1998 “ Angels Edge” Project 1998. Global Architecture Houses Exhibition, GA Gallery, Tokyo, Japan
 1998 Jyvaskyla Music and Arts Centre. Competition Exhibition, Jyvaskyla, Finland.
 1999 The American Institute of Architects New York Chapter 1999 Design Awards: Award for Interior Architecture for the project Axis Theatre, New York, New York.
 1998 Jyvaskyla Music and Arts Centre International Design Competition: First Runners up Group: 1998.

References

External links 
 MO'R
 Phoenix House
 Vieques House

Companies based in New York City
Companies established in 1996
1996 establishments in New York City
American architects